Sabine Heß (later Schubert, born 1 October 1958) is a German coxswain who competed for East Germany in the 1976 Summer Olympics.

She was born in Dresden. In 1976 she coxed the East German boat which won the gold medal in the coxed four event.

References

External links 
 

1958 births
Living people
Rowers from Dresden
People from Bezirk Dresden
East German female rowers
Coxswains (rowing)
Olympic rowers of East Germany
Rowers at the 1976 Summer Olympics
Olympic gold medalists for East Germany
Olympic medalists in rowing
Medalists at the 1976 Summer Olympics
World Rowing Championships medalists for East Germany
Recipients of the Patriotic Order of Merit in silver